Rena Station is a railway station located in Rena, Norway on the Røros Line. Services are provided by SJ Norge to Røros and Hamar. The station opened in 1871.

The station restaurant was taken over by Norsk Spisevognselskap on 1 October 1925 and was operated by the company until 31 December 1926.

References

Åmot
Railway stations in Hedmark
Railway stations on the Røros Line
Railway stations opened in 1871
1871 establishments in Norway